Csenge Kuczora (born 26 January 2000) is a Hungarian handballer for Váci NKSE.

Achievements 
National team
Junior European Championship:
: 2019
European Youth Olympic Festival:
: 2017
IHF Youth World Championship:
: 2018
Youth European Championship:
: 2017

Awards and recognition
 All-Star Team Best Defender of the Junior European Championship: 2019
 Top Scorer of the Nemzeti Bajnokság I: 2022

References

2000 births
Living people
Handball players from Budapest
Hungarian female handball players
21st-century Hungarian women